Stéphane Jean-Marc Sarrazin (born 2 November 1975) is a French professional racing driver. He has won races across a number of single-seater, sportscar and rallying disciplines and competitions, was French Formula Renault champion in 1994, and Le Mans Series champion in both 2007 and 2010. He has finished on the podium six times at the 24 Hours of Le Mans race, including four outright second positions, although he has never won. He participated in one Formula One Grand Prix, the 1999 Brazilian Grand Prix, for Minardi as a replacement for Luca Badoer, who had injured his wrist. He suffered a big spin in the race coming up to the start-finish straight on lap 31 and scored no championship points.

Career
During the 1999 season, Sarrazin raced in International Formula 3000, winning one race at the Hungaroring. In 2003, he raced in the Superfund World Series.

In 2004, Sarrazin converted to rallying and competed in two World Rally Championship events, posting a best result of 4th.  He was signed to drive Subaru's second car along with young Australian Chris Atkinson as a teammate to defending world champion Petter Solberg. He also competed at the 2004 Race of Champions.

Sarrazin drove an Aston Martin DBR9 in the GT1 class of the 2006 American Le Mans Series, but was announced on January 10, 2007 as an official works driver for Peugeot Sport in the Le Mans Series, driving the new 908 HDi FAP diesel Le Mans Prototype. He won the 2007 Le Mans Series with Pedro Lamy, by winning three races. Sarrazin also took pole position at the 2007 24 Hours of Le Mans and finished second in the race with Lamy and Sébastien Bourdais. He won the 2008 24 Hours of Spa driving the Vitaphone Racing Team Maserati MC12. He finished third in the 2009 Monte Carlo rally. Sarrazin finished second again in the 2009 24 Hours of Le Mans. He finished fourth overall on the Monte Carlo round of the 2010 Intercontinental Rally Challenge.

Following Peugeot's withdrawal from endurance racing, Sarrazin signed with Starworks Motorsport for the 2012 FIA World Endurance Championship. Sarrazin also signed a temporary deal to drive the Toyota TS030 Hybrid at Le Mans due to the withdrawal of Hiroaki Ishiura on medical grounds.

In 2013, Sarrazin joined Toyota Racing full-time as a driver of the Toyota TS030. Sarrazin helped the team finish 2nd at Le Mans and scored his first win with the team in Bahrain.

Sarrazin continued with Toyota Racing in 2014, and signed for Venturi Grand Prix to race in Formula E. He finished the first ever race of the series, the 2014 Beijing ePrix in 9th place. Two months later in November 2014 he took his first international rally victory in the Tour de Corse, which was the last rally of the 2014 European Rally Championship.

Sarrazin currently races in the Extreme E all-electric off road racing series for Veloce Racing. During the 2021 Island X-Prix, he suffered a massive rollover, but he came out unscathed, though he went to the medical centre for precautionary checks.

Racing record

Career summary

Single-seater racing

Complete International Formula 3000 results
(key) (Races in bold indicate pole position; races in italics indicate fastest lap)

Complete Formula One results
(key)

Complete Formula E results

(key) (Races in bold indicate pole position; races in italics indicate fastest lap)

Sportscar racing

24 Hours of Le Mans results

Complete Le Mans Series results

Complete FIA World Endurance Championship results

Rallying

WRC results

* Season still in progress.

WRC-3 results

* Season still in progress.

IRC results

Complete European Rally Championship results

Touring car racing

Complete V8 Supercar results

† Not Eligible for points

Off-road racing

Complete Extreme E results
(key)

References

External links

 
 

1975 births
Living people
People from Alès
French rally drivers
French racing drivers
French Formula Renault 2.0 drivers
French Formula Three Championship drivers
International Formula 3000 drivers
French Formula One drivers
Minardi Formula One drivers
24 Hours of Le Mans drivers
American Le Mans Series drivers
European Le Mans Series drivers
Intercontinental Rally Challenge drivers
World Rally Championship drivers
FIA GT1 World Championship drivers
Supercars Championship drivers
24 Hours of Daytona drivers
Rolex Sports Car Series drivers
FIA World Endurance Championship drivers
24 Hours of Spa drivers
Formula E drivers
European Rally Championship drivers
Sportspeople from Gard
Extreme E drivers
Racing Engineering drivers
Aston Martin Racing drivers
Peugeot Sport drivers
Toyota Gazoo Racing drivers
Venturi Grand Prix drivers
Techeetah drivers
Rebellion Racing drivers
SMP Racing drivers
Andretti Autosport drivers
Opel Team BSR drivers
Sébastien Loeb Racing drivers
West Competition drivers
Pescarolo Sport drivers
KCMG drivers
Starworks Motorsport drivers